Philippe Elie Le Royer was a French and Swiss politician from the 19th century, who served as the president of the French Senate and as the minister of Justice.

Early life
Philippe Le Royer was born in Geneva, Switzerland in 1816 to a notable Swiss and French family. His ancestors were peers of La Rochelle in the 14th century and subsequently printers to the King of France in the 16th century. Following edict of Nantes, his family became established as a bourgeois family of Geneva, Switzerland. The family held seats on the Council of Two Hundred, and were the proprietors of a renowned pharmacy. His father, Charles Le Royer was the captain of the garrison of the city of Geneva. Philippe Le Royer studied law in Paris, and became a lawyer based in Paris, Lyon and Chalon-sur-Saône.

Career
He became advocate General of Lyon, where he repressed severe riots following the Franco Prussian War in 1870. During this time, he administered a policy against arbitrary detention of key personalities from the Second French Empire. Following this, became elected as a representative of the National Assembly of 1871, representing the French Left. He served in the Senate of France from 1875 until his death and was its president (1882–1893). He served as minister of justice (1878–1879) in the Government of France under Prime Minister William Henry Waddington, during which he oversaw the case of amnesty for the Paris Commune. He died in Paris in 1897, and is now buried at the Père Lachaise Cemetery.

References

Bibliography

Dictionnaire des Parlementaires français, Jean Jolly.

1826 births
1897 deaths
Politicians from Geneva
Opportunist Republicans
French Ministers of Justice
Members of the National Assembly (1871)
French life senators
Presidents of the Senate (France)